Ekaterina Sergeyevna Baturina (born 28 July 1992) is a Russian luger.

Baturina competed at the 2014 Winter Olympics for Russia. In the women's singles she placed 11th.

As of September 2020, Baturina's best performance at the FIL World Luge Championships is 8th, in the 2019 Championships.

As of September 2015, Baturina's best Luge World Cup overall finish is 13th in 2014–15.

References

External links 
 
 

1992 births
Living people
Russian female lugers
Olympic lugers of Russia
Lugers at the 2014 Winter Olympics
Lugers at the 2018 Winter Olympics
Sportspeople from Krasnoyarsk